Shair Pur is a village located in Wazirabad Tehsil, Gujranwala District, Punjab, Pakistan.

Demography 
Shair Pur had a population of 524 in 2017.

Education 
For education no any government institute is functional, but some private schools are working in Shair Pur.

Communication 
The only way to get to Shair Pur is by road. This village is directly connected to the Gujranwala via Gujranwala-Ali Pur Chattha road. Besides driving a car anyone can reach in 55 minutes to Shair Pur village, the only other method of transport near this village is a train. The Wazirabad-Faisalabad rail link is the only nearby railway line, and Rasool Nagar is the nearest railway station.

See also 

 Pindori Kalan
 Pindori Khurd
 Ajitke Chattha

References 

Villages in Gujranwala District